is an anime film created in 2008. It is the 16th film based on the popular comedy manga and anime series, Crayon Shin-chan. Produced by Shin-Ei Animation, it lasts for 93 minutes and grossed about 1.2 billion yen. It was released in theaters on April 19, 2008, in Japan and was renamed Shin Chan Movie: The Golden Sword in India by Hungama TV on 26 January 2013.

Plot
Dark Lord of the Don Kurai Dark World plots to dominate the human world. In the movie, there exists a dark legend of the "Hero", the darkness Uchiharau, as well as the "three treasures”—one of which is the stolen "tak of copper”. A man who is knowledgeable about this plot of the Dark Lord is sent to the human world to find the remaining two treasures—"the shield of silver" and "golden sword."

At that time, Shinnosuke bought the "Action Sword", Action Kamen's new toy, in the department store he visits often. When he opened the box back home, however, it was accidentally mispackaged as an action Sword ruler. A few days later, he picked up a black dog that looked exactly like Shiro (his pet) on his way home from kindergarten. He named his new pet dog Kuro, or Black.

The same night, he also met a woman that came to visit the house suddenly to check if there were any Puririn around. Shinnosuke, who woke up, goes out with her without being suspicious of her appearance for he is attracted to the lady. The identity of Puririn was then revealed to be dark men who were sent to the human world. Now, Shinnosuke gets taken by the wiles of the dark which leads him to open the door that connects the human world and Don Kurai.

The next day, darkness creeps into the human world and the door Shinnosuke opened no longer exists. A variety of disasters befall his home field due to the darkness. At the same time, a girl named Tami Mata appears in front of Shinnosuke and tells of a hero named "Golden Sword" that will protect Shinnosuke. It was then shown that Shinnosuke was determined to fight the dark with Mata which Puririn later learned along with the fact that Mata appearance gimmick is a trap. The next day at night, Shinnosuke also encounters the same man who wanted him to sign an agreement, but Shinnosuke refuses to sign it. 

Shinchan forces his mother to buy an ultra hero sword without realising that it has an ancient prophecy in it. The sword causes a series of strange events in his life.

This is one of the best movies you could every watch, espicially kids would enjoy it the most.

Characters

Shinnosuke Nohara
Shinnosuke is the main character of crayon Shin-chan, son of Hiroshi and Misae. He is Himawari's brother, a 5-year kindergarten-aged boy whose nickname is "Shin-chan." He is popular for his mischievous behaviour, his strange activities include dressing up (often as an animal) and inappropriate jokes. He loves chocolate biscuits from "Chocobi" brand and a TV superhero named "Action Mask/Action Kamen", but he absolutely hates green bell peppers. He loves his Nohara family, especially her sister "Himawari." He always takes care of his sister. He has a gang of four friends Toru Kazama, Nene Sakurada, Masao Sato, and Bo Suzuki. Their gang name is "Kasukabe Defense Force" and the purpose of this group was to promote peace in the city of Kasukabe.

Misae Nohara
She is 29 year old mother of Shin-chan and Himawari and the wife of Hiroshi Nohara. She is also known as "Mitsi Nohara" in the dubbed version. She is a tough and strong woman. While at heart a caring and nurturing individual. She loves her family a lot and also fond of shopping. Her famous and symbolic moves includes "drilling" others' head with her fists (known as "guri-guri") and a series of punches on the head, creating comically large lumps. Her son often makes fun of her habitual constipation, as well as her fluctuating weight and small breasts. Misae mostly seen as a cautious and alert character because of her son's and husband's mischievous habits.

Mata Tami
Mata Tami first appears when defending Shinnosuke from becoming possession of the spear of gold. She is able to transform into various objects using her special ability "change into". Shinnosuke asked me why I called it my own, have answered the same "Shin-chan and Ola are saying yourself".
It would be changed to be sealed temporarily underlay Shinnosuke tricked Puririn in the second half of the story, the resurrection is to break the seal after Shinnosuke's world is screwed up. Challenge in the fight against the dark along with the Nohara family knew the situation.
When Shinnosuke became the pilot to change into a Shinden fighter that mimics the "Shinden" local fighter is, we have to shoot down enemy aircraft using the Cobra movement aerial acrobatics.

Kuro
Kuro is a mysterious dog that appears in front of Shinnosuke. Having black upon first meeting witch later turns entirely white when revealed to be Mata's father's silver shield. Kuro was picked up by Shinnosuke after being abandoned in a cardboard box on the street, and kept in the house with a white field.

Mack la Kuranosuke
Mack La Kuranosuke is one of the subordinates of the Sweat Duct Dark and is one of the men of wind wearing a top hat. I think it is pretty sneaky sadist from lines in the play. Kept a delay of weasel. Good at making a palindrome to be reading from the same text is also read from top to bottom. Transformed into a plane, but plagued Shinnosuke and also, I was defeated Nerawareru a slight chance.
Delay
It is a pet weasel Mac. Shinnosuke denied Mack has said is "cute".

Puririn-Uncock
Puririn-uncock is one of the subordinates of the Sweat Duct Dark, and admires Shinnosuke. Shinnosuke uses this at the beginning of the story to open Earth and connect Don Kurai "door of Darkness" to the real world. But then sealed the Mata trick Shinnosuke, it comes to revive Mata is aware of the truth the next day Shinnosuke. The fight against family field in the second half of the story, and misplaced anger is careful to Hiroshi for or apply makeup while chasing the family in the car, was driving while fiddling with mobile phones, he would hit the wall inadvertently forward.

Mata Tabi
Mata Tami's father, Mata Tabi who sets the plot in motion by sending the shield of gold, and silver pike to earth. He then takes the hands of the dark immediately after.

Ase Daku Dark
His name translates to "Don King of Kurai". The color of his body is split into halves of black and white. He can transform into a dragon and appears at the beginning of the story where he is Mata Tabi's father and is sent to Earth to retrieve the golden sword and silver shield. In a confrontation with Shinnosuke, he gets cut into his respective selves of white and black with the help of the golden sword and the silver shield. He dies at the end of the movie.

Alma Giraud
Alma Giraud is the main antagonist of the anime, coming up in Action Kamen. Equipped with a circular shield, the shield is enough to disable the action beam. He was overthrown by the "Action Sword", a new weapon.

Gingin
Gingin is the name of the silver shield.  Transformed into a black dog named Kuro, it came under Shinnosuke's care after having been sent to Earth by Mata Tabi.Gingin speaks in a male voice and utilizes the first person ("I").

Kinkin
Kinkin is the name of the golden sword. After coming to Earth, it took the form of a toy Shinnosuke was fond of, the "Action Sword" of the manga Action Kamen. Kinkin speaks in a female tone and takes upon the form of a ruler.

Doudou
Doudou is the name of the copper bell. It can talk to both Qin and Gingin. Doudou talks in an androgynous tone.

Cast
 Akiko Yajima - Shinnosuke Nohara
 Miki Narahashi - Misae Nohara
 Keiji Fujiwara - Hiroshi Nohara
 Satomi Kōrogi - Himawari Nohara
 Mari Mashiba - Kazama-Kun Shiro
 Yui Horie - Mata Tami
 Tamao Hayashi - Nene Sakurada
 Chie Satō - Bo-chan
 Rokurō Naya - Principal teacher
 Yumi Takada - Ms. Yoshinaga
 Michie Tomizawa - Ms. Matsuzaka
 Mitsuru Miyamoto - Makku
 Rei Sakuma - Chitai
 Takako Honda - Puririn
 Tesshō Genda - Action Kamen
 Etsuko Kozakura - Mimiko
 Shōzō Iizuka - Member of Parliament
 Chafurin - Razaya Dan
 Daisuke Gōri - Bunchou
 Takeharu Onishi as Mata Dabi
 Takuo Kawamura - Aruma Jiro

Theme Song
 Opening Theme – "YURU YURU DE-O!"
(Akiko Yajima) Shinnosuke Nohara – song / Takafumi Iwasaki – Arranger / 就 Yasushi Nakamura – composer Mutouyuji / – o Lyrics
 Insert song – "Gold, Gold, Money"
song / Toshiyuki Arakawa – - composer / Mitsuru Hongo – Lyrics o la Mac Kuranosuke (Mitsuru Miyamoto)
 Insert song – "Viva Viva Zunzun gymnastics"
song / Toshiyuki Arakawa – - composer / Mitsuru Hongo – o brother song lyrics (Yoshio Kojima)
 Insert song – "Dreaming little bird"
song / Megumi Little Women – - composer / Mitsuru Hongo – Lyrics o Mata Tami (Yui Horie)
 Ending Theme – "Let's go with a popular person!"
DJ OZMA – song / Ranmaru stars – Composer DJ OZMA / – Arrangement Lyrics

See also
 Crayon Shin-chan
 Yoshito Usui
 Shin-Ei Animation

References

External links
 
 

2008 anime films
Fierceness That Invites Storm! The Hero of Kinpoko
Toho animated films
Films directed by Mitsuru Hongo